Epigenomics is a peer-reviewed medical journal established in 2009 and published by Future Medicine. The editors-in-chief are James G. Herman (University of Pittsburgh Cancer Institute) and Jörg Tost. The journal covers all aspects of research on epigenomics and epigenetics and their implications for diagnosis, prognosis and therapeutics.

Abstracting and indexing 
The journal is abstracted and indexed in EMBASE/Excerpta Medica, Index Medicus/MEDLINE/PubMed, Chemical Abstracts, BIOSIS Previews, Science Citation Index Expanded, and Scopus. According to the Journal Citation Reports, the journal has a 2017 impact factor of 4.979, ranking it 31st out of 166 journals in the category "Genetics & Heredity".

References

External links 
 

Publications established in 2009
Medical genetics journals
English-language journals
Epigenetics
Future Science Group academic journals